DRRS may refer to:
Defense Readiness Reporting System
Duane-radial ray syndrome
Domain Revenue Recovery Services, Inc.
The Doodlebops Rockin' Road Show, a spinoff series to The Doodlebops.